Xylopia sericolampra is a species of flowering plant from Madagascar in the  family Annonaceae, described by Friedrich Ludwig Diels.

References

sericolampra